Minuscule 2755 (in the Gregory-Aland numbering), is a Greek minuscule manuscript of the New Testament, on 370 parchment leaves (32.2 cm by 23.2 cm). Dated paleografically to the 11th century.

Description  

The codex contains a complete text of the four Gospels with a commentary. The text is written in one column per page, in 29 lines per page.

The text is divided according to the Ammonian sections with references to the Eusebian Canons.

Kurt Aland did not place it in any Category.
It was not examined by the Claremont Profile Method.

The codex now is housed at Bible Museum Münster (Ms. 9).

See also 

 List of New Testament minuscules (2001–)
 Textual criticism
 Bible Museum Münster

References

External links 

 Manuscripts of the Bible Museum
 Images of manuscript 2755 at the CSNTM

Greek New Testament minuscules
11th-century biblical manuscripts